TN4 or TN-4 may refer to:
 Tennessee's 4th congressional district
 Tennessee State Route 4
 TN4, a postcode district in Tunbridge Wells, England; see TN postcode area